"Icky Thump" is a song recorded by the American alternative rock band the White Stripes. Written by Jack White, it was the first single released from their sixth and final album of the same name. The song is a heavy garage-rock piece whose lyrics challenge anti-immigration pundits for their hypocrisy. It was recorded and mixed at Nashville's Blackbird studio.

"Icky Thump" was released to significant commercial and critical success, with Rolling Stone naming in the 17th-best track of 2007. It was nominated for two Grammy Awards, winning one for Best Rock Performance by a Duo or Group with Vocal in 2008. Commercially, it peaked at number 26 in the United States, number nine in Canada, and number two in the United Kingdom, earning a platinum sales certification in the US and a silver certification in the UK.

History
The name of the track comes from the north-English exclamation "Ecky thump!" (Both “ecky” and “thump” are euphemisms for hell, but the collocation is not listed in the OED.) The phrase was popularized in an episode of the British comedy series The Goodies. The album title was then changed to "Icky" to make it more accessible to American teenage audiences.

Theme

Though grounded in straightforward garage rock to a greater degree than the Get Behind Me Satan singles, the song differed radically from previous White Stripes singles in its unusual construction: angular tempo-changes, stream-of-consciousness lyrics, and chaotic improvised snake-charming solos, played on a Univox synthesizer.

The song deals with the topic of immigration to the United States. The song itself criticizes contemporary American immigration policy, something seen also in the video. It is thus the first political White Stripes track since "The Big Three Killed My Baby," off The White Stripes.

The lyrics talk about someone (perhaps Jack White himself) taking a trip to Mexico in a wagon, easily crossing the border to Mexico, as opposed to the difficulties illegal Mexican immigrants face while crossing northwards. It then mentions a Mexican lady giving him a bed to sleep in, then tying him up, assaulting him and holding him hostage. When finally able to escape, White decides to start doing his own house chores (referring, most likely, to the hiring of illegal immigrants as very low paid house servants). In the video, when White escapes the lady's house and crosses back to the USA, he passes by Mexican workers building a wall, likely the so-called Great Wall of Mexico.

The defining verse against immigration policies comes near the end of the song:

Release and reception
"Icky Thump" was made available online through the United States and Canada iTunes Store on Thursday, April 26, 2007. The single reached number 26 on the Billboard Hot 100 and became the group's only Top 40 single on that chart. The song also reached number one (for three weeks) on the Alternative Songs chart and number 11 on the Hot Mainstream Rock Tracks chart. The song also ended the 15-week run of "What I've Done" by Linkin Park at the top of the Modern Rock Tracks chart when the song rose to the top of that chart in August. It was the second song by the White Stripes to top the chart, after "Seven Nation Army." It ended up being certified both Gold for physical shipments and Platinum for digital sales in the US.

Third Man Records/XL Recordings also released CD and vinyl versions of the "Icky Thump" single on June 11, 2007 in the UK. It is to date the duo's biggest UK chart hit, debuting at number 13 in the UK Singles Chart via download sales alone and peaking at number two the following week, marking their first UK Top 3 single, and was kept off the number-one spot by "Umbrella" by Rihanna featuring Jay-Z. On the Scottish Singles Chart, however, the song dethroned "Umbrella" to claim the number-one spot. After peaking, the song very quickly dropped out of the Top 100, spending only seven weeks on both charts and ending 2007 as the UK's 122nd best-selling song.

This song was number 17 on Rolling Stones list of the 100 Best Songs of 2007. On December 6, 2007, "Icky Thump" was nominated for two 2007 Grammy Awards: Best Rock Song and Best Rock Performance by a Duo or Group with Vocal, winning the latter category. In Australia, where the song reached number 46, the song was number 23 on the Triple J Hottest 100 of 2007.

Promotion
The song was featured in the special footage clip of Warner Bros. Pictures' Justice League shown at San Diego Comic-Con 2016 and was later included in the film's soundtrack.

Music video
The music video for "Icky Thump" premiered on AOL.com at midnight EDT on May 23, 2007. The video was co-directed by Jack White and the Malloy Brothers. The video was filmed in Nashville, Tennessee, though it is set in Mexico. It features Spanish subtitles acting as a translation of the lyrics. The video debuted on MTV's Total Request Live on July 17, 2007, marking the first time a White Stripes video was ever on the countdown.

Icky Trump 
During the campaigning for the 2016 United States presidential election, then Republican candidate Donald Trump used one of the White Stripes' most iconic tracks, "Seven Nation Army" in a campaign video, much to the dismay of Jack White, a staunch Democrat and supporter of Bernie Sanders (White has even performed music as an opening act for Sanders' rallies, as if opening for a concert). In response, Jack and Meg White posted on the White Stripes Facebook page together for the first time in five years in a since deleted post  to threaten legal action (nothing came of this threat, though they did have a valid basis for a case), as Trump's campaign had done so without the permission of the White Stripes or Third Man Records, in violation of U.S. Copyright Law. It also stated that they were 'disgusted by this association, and by the illegal use of their song' and that they had 'nothing whatsoever to do with this video'.

In further response, White and White, through the online TMR merchandise store, released a T-shirt referred to by the website as the "Anti Trump Unisex T Shirt", reusing the colors and font from the Make America Great Again campaign's iconic hats, that read "Icky Trump" on the front, wordplay on Donald Trump's last name. The shirt was available for sale only during the election campaigning, then went back up in October of 2020, when Donald Trump was once again running for U.S. President. Again, they were discontinued after the election finished.

The back of the shirts reused the aforementioned immigration verses, starting with "White Americans" and including everything up to and including "...And a prostitute too."  Interestingly, the first two lines read "White Americans? What? / Nothing better to do?" while the original official lyrics (present on the vinyl record's sleeve) read "White Americans, what? / Nothing better to do".

Notably, this all came just a few months after Trump had done something similar to Queen, using their hit "We Are the Champions" not once, but twice, while walking on stage. Due to its use as a walk-out song, and not in any released media, this was not in violation of copyright law, but it did come after explicit request from the band that he not use any of their songs.

Track listings
7-inch white vinyl (companion to the NME-distributed record that was given away with copies of the magazine on stands June 6)
 "Icky Thump"
 "Etching" (no audio)

Standard 7-inch
 "Icky Thump"
 "Baby Brother"

CD single
 "Icky Thump" – 4:18
 "Catch Hell Blues" – 4:16

Personnel
 Jack White – vocals, guitar, clavioline, production
 Meg White – drums

Charts and certifications

Weekly charts

Year-end charts

Certifications

References

External links
 Official website of the band
 Song lyrics, made available on the White Stripes' official website.
 'Icky Thump' song of the day on thishereboogie.com 11 Dec 2008

2007 singles
2007 songs
Macaronic songs
Music videos directed by The Malloys
Number-one singles in Scotland
Protest songs
Punk blues songs
Songs written by Jack White
Third Man Records singles
XL Recordings singles
Warner Records singles
The White Stripes songs
Works about immigration to the United States